Cushetunk may refer to:
Cushetunk, New Jersey
Cushetunk, New York
Cushetunk Mountain